Mamadou Sissako (born 20 April 1996) is a French professional footballer who plays as a forward for Championnat National 2 club FC 93.

Club career
Sissako joined Troyes on 27 July 2016 after playing for Le Havre. He made his professional debut for Troyes in a 1–1 (4–3) Coupe de France penalty shootout win over Saint-Étienne on 24 January 2018.

In December 2021, Sissako joined FC 93.

International career
Sissako was born in France and is of Mauritanian descent. He represented France at youth international level.

References

External links
 
 
 
 
 
 HAC Foot Profile

1996 births
Living people
People from Villepinte, Seine-Saint-Denis
Footballers from Seine-Saint-Denis
Association football forwards
French footballers
France youth international footballers
French sportspeople of Mauritanian descent
Le Havre AC players
ES Troyes AC players
Football Club 93 Bobigny-Bagnolet-Gagny players
Championnat National 2 players
Championnat National 3 players